The Council of Presidents is the executive leadership body of the Vermont State Colleges System (VSCS), the governance organization for public colleges in the U.S. state of Vermont. The council is composed of a chancellor and executive staff of the VSCS and the presidents of the four member colleges. The council works with the Board of Trustees of the Vermont State Colleges to set policies and procedures for the system.

The members of the Council of Presidents currently are: VSCS Chancellor Jeb Spaulding; President Karen Scolforo, Castleton University, President Joyce Judy, Community College of Vermont; President Elaine C. Collins, Northern Vermont University; President Patricia Moulton, the Vermont Technical College; and VSC General Counsel William Reedy, Chief Financial Officer Thomas Robbins, Chief Academic Officer Annie Howell, and Director of Community Relations and Public Policy Dan Smith.

See also 

 List of colleges and universities in the United States
 List of colleges and universities in Vermont

External links 
 The Vermont State Colleges System web site

Liberal arts colleges in the United States